Vanda Station was an Antarctic research base in the western highlands (Victoria Land) of the Ross Dependency, specifically on the shore of Lake Vanda, at the mouth of Onyx River, in the Wright Valley.

History
The four original station buildings were constructed in the austral summers of 1967–1968 and 1968–1969, just prior to the first winter-over by a five-man team from January to October 19, 1969. Subsequent wintering parties occupied the station in 1970 and 1974. During summer seasons, Vanda station was fully staffed until 1991. Scientific programs principally included meteorology, hydrology, seismology, earth currents, and magnetics. The station was administered by the Department of Scientific and Industrial Research (DSIR), and was supported logistically by the permanent New Zealand research base of Scott Base on Ross Island.

Vanda Station was well known for The Royal Lake Vanda Swim Club. Visitors to Lake Vanda Station could dip into the high salinity waters when the icecap edge melted out during summer to form a "moat", and receive a Royal Lake Vanda Swim Club shoulder patch. Vanda staff would assist the melt by hacking out a "pool". Many dignitaries and politicians were inducted into the club, The dip had to be naked (Rule 1), complete immersion (Rule 4), witnessed by a "Vandal" (Vanda Station staffer) and with no restrictions on photography (Rule 6) to qualify. Rule 10 allowed a natural figleaf, but it had to be natural and also naturally green without artificial aid.

In 1995, environment concerns resulted in the base being closed. Various activities associated with the base's occupation, including excavations, the erection of buildings, disturbances caused by vehicle movements, the storage of consumables, waste disposal, and accidental spills, led to the effort to remove the station. Since removal, analysis of the lake water and algae was performed for a number of years to ensure the lake was not contaminated by greywater and other wastes.

There is now a street named after this base in Queenstown, New Zealand, called Vanda Place, and it is located just a few hundred metres from Scott Place.

Today, an automatic weather station is at the site of former Vanda Station, and Lake Vanda Hut, a shelter that is periodically (summer only) occupied by 2 to 8 New Zealand stream researchers.

Climate

See also
 List of Antarctic research stations
 List of Antarctic field camps
 Crime in Antarctica
 Climate of Antarctica

References

Bibliography

Vanda Station: History of an Antarctic Outpost by David L. Harrowfield (Christchurch 1999 & 2006, New Zealand Antarctic Society Inc, 52 pp.) 

Outposts of Antarctica
New Zealand and the Antarctic
Outposts of the Ross Dependency
McMurdo Dry Valleys
1969 establishments in Antarctica
1991 disestablishments in Antarctica
Geography of the Ross Dependency
History of the Ross Dependency